The Pittsburgh Lyceum were a professional football team based in Pittsburgh, Pennsylvania from 1906 until 1910. The team played against many of the top "Ohio League", the most notables being the Canton Bulldogs and the Massillon Tigers. They were regarded as one of the top professional football teams in Pittsburgh from 1907 until 1909. The Lyceum was also the last pro football championship team Pittsburgh would produce until the 1970s. Many of their victories came against many of the strongest teams in Pennsylvania, West Virginia, and Ohio. Hence, they were given the mythical moniker the "Tri-State Champions" in 1909. The team was finally defeated in 1909, via an upset by the Dayton Oakwoods in their final game of 1909. The Lyceums broke up after a disappointing 1910 season. The multi-sport Lyceum organization that the football team represented continued to exist, and organized a new football team in 1924. One of the players on this team was Art Rooney, who would go on establish the Pittsburgh Steelers and become enshrined in the Pro Football Hall of Fame.

References

1906 establishments in Pennsylvania
Defunct American football teams in Pennsylvania
Lyceum
Early professional American football teams in Pennsylvania
American football teams in Pittsburgh